The Journal of Women & Aging is a quarterly peer-reviewed healthcare journal focusing on health challenges facing women in their later years. The journal was established in 1989 and is published by Routledge. The editor-in-chief is Francine Conway (of Rutgers University).

Abstracting and indexing 
The journal is abstracted and indexed in:

According to the Journal Citation Reports, the journal has a 2015 impact factor of 0.846, ranking it 22nd out of 40 journals in the category "Women's Studies".

See also 
 List of women's studies journals

References

External links 
 

English-language journals
Publications established in 1989
Taylor & Francis academic journals
Quarterly journals
Women's health
Women's studies journals